Paradiso (Lucio Battisti Songbook) is a compilation album by Italian singer Mina, released on 30 November 2018 by Warner Music Italy and PDU. The compilation contains all of Lucio Battisti's songs recorded by Mina throughout her career. Many of them have already been previously published on the albums Minacantalucio and Mazzini canta Battisti, released respectively in 1975 and 1994. The album also features (but only on the CD version) Spanish and French versions of songs recorded in the seventies.

Track listing 
All lyrics are written by Mogol except where noted; all music is composed by Lucio Battisti.

CD edition

LP edition

Charts

Weekly charts

Year-end charts

Certifications and sales

References

External links
 

2018 compilation albums
Mina (Italian singer) compilation albums
Warner Music Group compilation albums